Cerrig Man is a village in Anglesey, in north-west Wales, in the community of Llaneilian and the electoral ward of Twrcelyn. It is located a mile north of Penysarn and a mile south of Amlwch.

References

Villages in Anglesey
Llaneilian